While Saint Pierre and Miquelon no longer has any functioning railways, today it has  of highways plus  of unpaved roads. Its only major harbour is at Saint-Pierre although there is a smaller harbour at Miquelon.

Water transport
A regular car ferry service is provided between Saint-Pierre and the Canadian town of Fortune, Newfoundland and Labrador. As of August 2021, there is now regular ferry service between the two destinations capable of carrying 15 cars and three tractor-trailer trucks.

In the past from 2005 to 2009, Atlantic Jet provided a ferry service to the islands from Canada, operated privately by SPM Express SA.

Jeune France is a smaller ferry serving seasonal local service between St. Pierre and Langlade. The ship arrived in 2012 replacing Saint-George XII, but has been in dry dock since early 2015.

Several cruise ship lines visit Saint-Pierre. They dock 2 km northeast of downtown, near the end of the coastal road. Boats also provide access to Ile aux Marins.

Air transport

Air transport is provided by Air Saint-Pierre which directly connects Saint-Pierre with Miquelon and seasonally with Paris-Charles de Gaulle Airport in France, and with Montreal, Halifax, Saint John's and the Magdalene Islands in Canada.

Other travel to France involves transfer with other airlines via Montreal:

Air Canada
Paris-Charles de Gaulle Airport
Lyon
Marseille
Nice
Air France
Paris-Charles de Gaulle Airport
Air Transat
Bordeaux
Nantes
Toulouse
Paris
Lyon
Marseille
Nice
Corsair International
Paris-Orly Airport

Air St. Pierre began its non-stop weekly route to Paris (seasonal) in 2018.

The Saint-Pierre - Miquelon route is one of the shortest scheduled airline routes in the world in terms of distance and flight duration.

Car transport
However, the islands do not follow the standard French numbering system. Until 1952, cars were simply numbered from 1 onwards, without any code to identify them as being from Saint Pierre and Miquelon. Beginning in 1952, they had serial numbers followed by the letters SPM, e.g. 9287 SPM. Since 2000, all numbers have begun with the letters SPM followed by a serial number and serial letter, e.g. SPM 1 A. Vehicles on the islands are mainly French vehicles with French plates, although recently American vehicles with North American plates are being common due to the new car ferry service to Canada.

Road signs are in French and are European influenced.

References

External links

 SPM ferries
 SPM Express SA